The Registered Designs, Act, 1949 (12, 13 and 14 Geo. 6 c. 88) is an act in the United Kingdom concerning copyright and related rights, industrial designs, patents, protection of undisclosed information. The purpose of the act was to consolidate certain enactments relating to registering designs. "The Act prescribes that where an application for the registration of a design has been abandoned or refused, information filed in pursuance of the registration shall not be open to public inspection".

Part IV of the Copyright, Designs and Patents Act 1988 contains a certain number of amendments to the Registered Designs Act 1949.

Registrable designs and proceedings for registration
A design which complies with the conditions mentioned in article 1 of CDR.

References

External links
Design right at Gov.uk
"Falsely representing a design as being registered: what does one do?" - Offences relating to Section 35 of the Registered Designs Act, Prof Jeremy Phillips, November 2014
Contents of the act as amended at Gov.uk

United Kingdom intellectual property law
United Kingdom Acts of Parliament 1949